El Abiodh Sidi Cheikh is a district in El Bayadh Province, Algeria. It was named after its capital, El Abiodh Sidi Cheikh, where most of the population lives. This district has one of the longest placenames in the country.

Municipalities
The district is further divided into 4 municipalities:
El Abiodh Sidi Cheikh
El Bnoud
Aïn El Orak
Arbaouet

Districts of El Bayadh Province